"Sweet Nothing" is a song performed by English singer-songwriter Gabrielle Aplin. The song was released as a digital download on 6 August 2015 as the second single from her second studio album Light Up the Dark. The song was written by Gabrielle Aplin, Luke Potashnick and Charlotte O'Connor.

Music video
A music video to accompany the release of "Sweet Nothing" was first released onto YouTube on 6 August 2015.

Track listing

Charts

Release history

References

2015 songs
2015 singles
Gabrielle Aplin songs
Songs written by Gabrielle Aplin